The Georgia Chamber of Commerce is a statewide membership organization centered on a mission of pro-business advocacy and headquartered in Atlanta, Georgia, United States. The Georgia Chamber claims to oppose legislation which most small and large business owners would consider a threat to their business success.

History 
Founded in 1915 as the Georgia Manufacturing Association, the Georgia Chamber renamed itself the Associated Industries of Georgia in 1939. In 1968, the organization became the Georgia Business and Industry Association, and then in 1983 became the Business Council of Georgia. The most recent name change happened in 1992. The organization has been known as the Georgia Chamber of Commerce ever since.

Throughout the years, the Georgia Chamber of Commerce has cultivated relationships with several smaller statewide associations, entering into affiliate partnerships with six groups. These organizations include Leadership Georgia (1971), the Georgia Self-Insurers Association (1975) the Georgia Partnership for Excellence in Education (1990), the Georgia Employers' Association (2003), the Council on Alcohol and Drugs/Drugs Don't Work (2004), and the Tourism Development Alliance of Georgia (2004).

The current President and CEO is Chris Clark, who has held the position since 2010.

Today, the Georgia Chamber of Commerce employs approximately 30 people in the areas of operations, member services, government affairs, public policy, and communications. Hundreds of volunteers from businesses throughout the state are part of the organization's board of directors, government affairs council and policy committees.

State chamber vs. local chamber 
The Georgia Chamber is unique in the sense that each of the organization's activities are designed for business advocacy purposes – including direct lobbying efforts, membership events, the Georgia Business Action Network (GBAN), and others. Local chambers, on the other hand, tend to focus on economic development and tourism projects. The Georgia Chamber is not a competitor to the local chambers in the state – rather, it is seen as a complement to networking and economic development programs offered at the local level.

Lobbying efforts 

The Georgia Chamber of Commerce maintains an in-house team of lobbyists. They promote legislation favorable to Georgia businesses and lobby against bills considered detrimental to business interests.

Recent legislative successes include:
 Comprehensive Statewide Water Management Plan
 Business tax incentives and prevention of expensive insurance mandates
 Sales tax holidays, "Made in Georgia" marketing, water and energy efficient products
 Civil justice reform and class action lawsuit reform
 Provisions for expedited reviews of permits/variances
 Tourism sales tax reimbursement

On March 12, 2021, the Chamber issued a statement opposing Republican election reforms that would end no-excuse absentee voting, limit early voting hours, restrict drop-boxes for mail ballots, and curtail early voting on Sundays.

The Georgia Initiative 

The Georgia Initiative is an effort launched in 2008 and designed to reposition the Georgia Chamber from a primarily reactive to a highly proactive organization.

The objective of the Georgia Initiative is to make proactive participation and leadership possible by: increasing the capacity of the Georgia Chamber to identify key legislative initiatives that enable progressive change, to develop and shape policy positions that will drive that change, to more effectively lobby to support these positions, and to dramatically expand communications initiatives and infrastructure to support this proactive shift.

Areas of public policy focus under the Georgia Initiative include:
 Education and Workforce Development
 Environment and Energy
 Existing Business and Industry
 Health Care
 International
 Law and Judiciary
 Tax
 Tourism
 Transportation

The Red Carpet Tour and Georgia Quail Hunt 
The Red Carpet Tour and Georgia Quail Hunt are events hosted in partnership by the Georgia Chamber of Commerce and the Georgia Allies. Both events host business executives from around the world each year to learn about economic development opportunities offered by the state of Georgia. Past event participants who eventually moved company headquarters to Georgia include Georgia Pacific and NCR.

The Red Carpet Tour is held each April and has been in existence since 1959. While participants visit Augusta each year to attend the Masters Golf Tournament, a second location differs from year-to-year to allow further exploration of the state. Locations have included Albany, Athens, Atlanta, Columbus, Dalton, Gainesville, Rome, Savannah and Valdosta.

The Georgia Quail Hunt began in 1988 and is held each year in Southwest Georgia. Guests participate in quail hunting and shooting instruction on nine different Southern plantations while networking with Georgia business and legislative leaders. Originally called the Fall Feather Hunt, the name was changed to the Georgia Quail Hunt to reflect the change in the time of year the event was held.

References

External links 
 Georgia Chamber of Commerce
 Employers for Quality Health Care
 Creating an Early Consensus on Water
  Georgia Chamber of Commerce Honors Rep. Lynn Smith
 Rome Hosts Red Carpet Tour

Government of Georgia (U.S. state)
Economy of Georgia (U.S. state)